The Macau Open is a men's professional golf tournament on the Asian Tour which takes place in Macau. It was founded in 1998. The venue is the Macau Golf and Country Club at Coloane. Past winners including international stars and multiple European Tour Order of Merit champions Colin Montgomerie and Lee Westwood, as well as 6-time European Tour winner Simon Dyson. In 2016, the purse was US$1,100,000.

Winners

Notes

References

External links

Coverage on Asian Tour's official site

Former Asian Tour events
Golf tournaments in Macau
Recurring sporting events established in 1998
1998 establishments in Macau